Chalysa Janee "Chay" Shegog (born February 22, 1990) is an American basketball player who played for the Connecticut Sun in the WNBA in the 2012 season. Shegog played for the North Carolina Tar Heels in college. In 2012, she was selected as the 21st overall draft pick for the WNBA by the Connecticut Sun. In August 2012, Shegog was waived by the Sun. She played for Hungarian team UNISEAT Gyor in the WNBA off-season. As of now, Shegog is working as a gym teacher at Alternative Paths Training School, in Fredericksburg.

Personal
Shegog was born Chalysa Janee Shegog in San Diego, California on February 22, 1990. She is the daughter of Theresa (née Poblete) and Darnell Shegog. Shegog has two brothers, Richard and Anthony. Her family lived in Ewa Beach, Hawaii before moving to Virginia just before her freshman year of high school.

USA Basketball 
 Silver Medal at 2007 USA Youth Development Festival. Shegog averaged 7.6 points per game, 5.6 rebounds per game and 1.6 blocks per game to help the USA Blue Team to a 2–3 record and silver medal.
 Participated in the 2008 USA U18 National Team Trials.
 In 2009 Shegog was selected for the USA Women's U19 National Team.

High school 
 Shegog was named a WBCA All-American in 2008.  She participated in the 2008 WBCA High School All-America Game, where she scored fifteen points and eleven rebounds for the victorious Red Team 
 Shegog was selected to play for the Girls East Team in the 2008 McDonald's All-American Game. Shegog tallied six points, seven rebounds and two steals as a starter for the East Team.
 Played AAU for the Fairfax Stars and won the 2003 13U national title.
 Shegog is currently Brooke Point's all-time leader in points (1,692), rebounds, blocks (570) and assists (214).

College 
Shegog was recruited by colleges including Duke and LSU but committed to the Tar Heels early. Shegog played for the University of North Carolina at Chapel Hill and lettered in all four seasons. Shegog reached 1000 career points in December 2011. In early January 2012 Shegog was the leading scorer in the ACC conference with an average of 17.3 points per game.

North Carolina statistics

Source

Connecticut Sun
In the 2012 season, Shegog saw very little court time and finished with a total of 3 points.

WNBA draft
Shegog was selected as the #21 overall pick in the 2012 WBA Draft by the Connecticut Sun.

Overseas career
In 2012, Shegog played for Hungarian team UNI SEAT Gyor.

Awards and honors 
 Was named to Parade Magazine fourth All-America team in 2007 and third All-American team in 2008 
 Was named the Fredericksburg Freelance Star Player of the Year in all four of her high school varsity seasons.
 Was named to the 2008 Slam Magazine All-America third team.
 Was named to the 2007 and 2008 Washington Post All-Met first team and honorable mention in 2005 and 2006.
 Was named the 2007 and 2008 Commonwealth District Player of the Year, and was selected to the All-Commonwealth District and All-Northwest Region first teams in 2005–2008.
 Was named to the 2009 Atlantic Coast Conference All-Freshman Team.
 Earned ACC Rookie of the Week honors in 2008 and 2011.
 Was named to the All-ACC Conference's second-team in 2012.

References

External
 Official Tar Heels Player Profile

1990 births
Living people
African-American basketball players
American sportspeople of Filipino descent
American women's basketball players
Basketball players from Hawaii
Basketball players from Virginia
Centers (basketball)
Connecticut Sun draft picks
Connecticut Sun players
McDonald's High School All-Americans
North Carolina Tar Heels women's basketball players
Parade High School All-Americans (girls' basketball)
People from Honolulu County, Hawaii
People from Stafford County, Virginia
Basketball players from San Diego
21st-century African-American sportspeople
21st-century African-American women